Nirosha is an Indian film and television actress. She is known for her works predominantly in Tamil, Telugu films. She has also starred with few Malayalam and Kannada films and was popular in the 1990s. Nirosha made her debut in Mani Ratnam’s flick Agni Natchathiram (1988).

Filmography

Tamil

 Agni Natchathiram (1988) - Debut in Tamil
 Soora Samhaaram (1988) 
 Senthoora Poove (1988) 
 Paravaigal Palavitham (1988)  
 Pattikattu Thambi (1988)
 Paandi Nattu Thangam (1989) 
 Sonthakkaran (1989)
 Kai Veesamma Kai Veesu (1989) 
 Poruthathu Pothum (1989) 
 Maruthu Pandi (1990)
 Pachai Kodi (1990) 
 Kavalukku Kettikaran (1990) 
 Inaindha Kaigal (1990) 
 Manitha Jaathi (1991)  
 Vetri Padigal (1991) 
 Annan Ennada Thambi Ennada (1992) 
 Amma Nagamma (1992) 
 Paarambariyam (1993)  
 Maindhan (1994) 
 Valli Vara Pora (1995)
 Puthiya Aatchi (1995) 
 Kandha Kadamba Kathir Vela (2000)
 Priyamaana Thozhi (2003) 
 Kadhal Dot Com (2003) 
 Pavalakkodi (2003)
 Winner (2003) 
 Kurumbu (2003) 
 Thaka Thimi Tha (2005)
 Daas (2005)
 Naalai (2006) 
 Nanbanin Kadhali (2007) 
 Malaikottai (2007)
 Silambattam (2008) 
 Padikkadavan (2009) 
 Ambasamudram Ambani (2010) 
 Summa Nachunu Irukku (2013) 
 Pappali (2014)
 MGR Sivaji Rajini Kamal (2015)
 Savaale Samaali (2015)
 Enakku Innoru Per Irukku (2016)
 Ka Ka Ka Po (2016)
 Vellikizhamai 13am Thethi (2016)
 Kaththi Sandai (2016)
Thaanaa Serndha Koottam (2018)
Pottu (2019) 
100 (2019)
Oru Kudaikul (2021)
Raajavamsam (2021)

Telugu

  Muddula Mavayya(1989)
 Mahajananiki Maradalu Pilla (1990)
 Nari Nari Naduma Murari (1990) 
Bujjigadi Babai (1990)
 Kobbari Bondam (1991)
 Madhura Nagarilo (1991)
 Attintlo Adde Mogudu (1991)
 Stuartpuram Police Station (1991)
Mugguru Attala Muddula Alludu (1991)
Tharangalu (1991)
Atirathudu (1991)
 Naga Kanya (1992)
 Detective Narada (1992)
 Asadhyulu (1992)
Yamudannaki Mogudu (1992)
Bhale Khaideelu (1992)
Priyathama (1992)
Enkanna Babu (1992)
 One by Two (1993) 
 Pachani Samsaram (1993)
 Mounam (1995)
 Naa Allari (2003)
 Oka Oorilo (2005)
Nuvvu Thopu Raa (2019)

Kannada

 Ibbaru Hendira Muddina Police (1991)
 Midida Hrudayagalu (1993)
 Lockup Death (1994)
 Gandugali (1994)
 Mother India (1995)
 Ooho (1995)
 Emergency (1995)
 Shiva (1995)
 Palegara (1996)
 Brindavana (2013)

Malayalam
 Arjun Dennis (1988)
 Oru Muthassi Katha (1988)
 Thacholi Varghese Chekavar (1995)
 Sipayi Lahala (1995)
 Indraprastham (1996)  
 Njan Salperu Ramankutty (2004)
 ''Kalyana Kurimanam (2005)

Television

Awards
 She won Nandi Special Jury Award for excellent performance in Stuartpuram Police Station film (1991).

References

External links
 

Living people
Actresses in Kannada cinema
Actresses in Telugu cinema
Actresses in Malayalam cinema
Indian film actresses
Actresses in Tamil cinema
20th-century Indian actresses
21st-century Indian actresses
People from Colombo
Actresses in Tamil television
Actresses in Telugu television
Year of birth missing (living people)